Bellamy-Philips House (also known as Oak Forest Plantation) is a historic plantation house and a later home located near Battleboro, Nash County, North Carolina.

Description and history 
The Green House dates to the early 19th century, and is a two-story three-bay, single pile, Late Georgian/Federal style frame dwelling. The Philips House was built in 1905, and is a cubical two-story, two room deep central hall plan frame dwelling with a pyramidal slate roof. It features a one-story front porch with a conical roofed circular Classical Revival portico and Ionic order columns.

It was listed on the National Register of Historic Places on July 12, 1982.

References

Plantation houses in North Carolina
Houses on the National Register of Historic Places in North Carolina
Georgian architecture in North Carolina
Federal architecture in North Carolina
Neoclassical architecture in North Carolina
Houses completed in 1905
Houses in Nash County, North Carolina
National Register of Historic Places in Nash County, North Carolina
1905 establishments in North Carolina